Primrose Path or The Primrose Path may refer to:
Original quote from Hamlet I, iii, by William Shakespeare
The Primrose Path (Stoker novel), an 1875 novel by Bram Stoker
The Primrose Path, a 1915 play by Bayard Veiller
The Primrose Path, the original working title of the 1920 film Burnt Wings based on the Veiller play
"The Primrose Path", a short story by D.H. Lawrence, published in 1922 in England, My England and Other Stories
The Primrose Path (1925 film), an American silent film starring Clara Bow
Primrose Path (1931 film), an American film directed by William A. O'Connor
The Primrose Path (1934 film), a British film directed by Reginald Denham 
Primrose Path (1940 film), a 1940 film
Primrose Path (Jimmy Knepper and Bobby Wellins album), an album recorded in 1980 by Jimmy Knepper with Bobby Wellins
The Primrose Path, a 1987 novel by Joyce Thies
The Primrose Path (Matas novel), a 1995 novel by Carol Matas
The Primrose Path, a 2013 album by Jonathan Bree
Primrose Path (Dream State album), a 2019 album by Dream State

See also
Rumpole and the Primrose Path, radio play and short story by John Mortimer